Inner Mongolia College of Farming and Animal Husbandry is located in Tongliao, Inner Mongolia, China.(merged into Inner Mongolia University for Nationalities)

Universities and colleges in Inner Mongolia
Agricultural universities and colleges in China